Richard von Kühlmann (3 May 1873 – 16 February 1948) was a German diplomat and  industrialist. From 6 August 1917 to 9 July 1918, he served as Germany's Secretary of State for Foreign Affairs, and led the delegation that negotiated the Treaty of Brest-Litovsk, which removed the Russian Empire from World War I in March 1918.

Biography
Kühlmann was born in Constantinople (present-day Istanbul). From 1908 to 1914, he was councillor of the German embassy in London, and was very active in the study of all phases of contemporary political and social life in Great Britain and even in Ireland from where his reports may have helped persuade Berlin that Britain was unlikely to enter a continental fray.

Kühlmann may have secretly visited Ireland twice in the months before the outbreak of war, where, on either side of the question of Home Rule, Unionists in the north and Nationalists in the south were arming (with German munitions). In an account that appeared in Manchester's Daily Despatch, Kühlmann's dispatches from London were interpreted in Berlin as evidence that Britain was so embarrassed by the Irish Question that in all probability she would be unable to participate in a war—that her hands were tied. Kühlmann had gone so far as to report "in all seriousness" the "solemn declaration" of "a most loyal Ulsterman" that "we would rather be ruled by the Kaiser than by the Pope."

At the outbreak of War, Kühlmann was councillor of the embassy at Constantinople. In October 1914 he founded the News Bureau which became a vehicle for German propaganda in the Ottoman Empire. This included postcards of ruined Belgian churches, which were used to appeal to the Jihadist sentiments held by those who had participated in massacres of Christians in Constantinople in 1896

During the Armenian genocide, Kühlmann was initially reluctant to expose the massacres against the Armenian population. Kühlmann, who held sympathetic beliefs toward Turkish nationalism, repeatedly used the term "alleged" and excused the Turkish government for the massacres. Kühlmann, in defense of the Turkish government and the German-Turkish World War alliance, stated that the policies against the Armenians was a matter of "internal politics". However, Kühlmann eventually stated that, "The destruction of the Armenians was undertaken on a massive scale. This policy of extermination will for a long time stain the name of Turkey."

He was subsequently minister at The Hague, and from September 1916 until August 1917, ambassador at Constantinople.

On 25 January 1906 he married Margarete Freiin von Stumm (1884–1917). His son was German politician and industrialist Knut von Kühlmann-Stumm (1916-1977).

Foreign Secretary
Appointed foreign secretary in August 1917, he led the delegation that negotiated the Treaty of Brest-Litovsk, which removed the Russian Empire, now under Bolshevik control, from World War I in March 1918.

In December 1917 von Kühlmann explained the main goals of his diplomacy was to subvert and undermine the political unity of the enemy states:
The disruption of the Entente and the subsequent creation of political combinations agreeable to us constitute the most important war aim of our diplomacy. Russia appeared to be the weakest link in the enemy chain. The task therefore was gradually to loosen it, and, when possible, to remove it. This was the purpose of the subversive activity we caused to be carried out in Russia behind the front--in the first place promotion of separatist tendencies and support of the Bolsheviks. It was not until the Bolsheviks had received from us a steady flow of funds through various channels and under different labels that they were in a position to be able to build up their main organ, Pravda, to conduct energetic propaganda and appreciably to extend the originally narrow basis of their party.

The Bolsheviks have now come to power; how long they will retain power cannot be yet foreseen. They need peace in order to strengthen their own position; on the other hand it is entirely in our interest that we should exploit the period while they are in power, which may be a short one, in order to attain firstly an armistice and then, if possible, peace.

He also negotiated the Peace of Bucharest of 7 May 1918, with Romania. In the treaty negotiations, Kühlmann encountered opposition from the higher command of the army, and, in particular, of Erich Ludendorff, who desired fuller territorial guarantees on Germany's eastern frontier, the establishment of a German protectorate over the Baltic States and stronger precautions against the spread of Bolshevism.

In June 1918, he delivered in the Reichstag a speech on the general situation, in the course of which he declared that the war could not be ended by arms alone, implying that it would require diplomacy to secure peace. This utterance was misinterpreted in Germany, the High Command was drawn into the controversy which arose over it, and Kühlmann's position became untenable. He was essentially dismissed from office by the Chancellor, Georg von Hertling, in a speech notionally intended to explain away his statement and, after an interview with Emperor Wilhelm II at the front, he tendered his resignation in July 1918.

See also
Witnesses and testimonies of the Armenian genocide

Notes

References

External links

 

1873 births
1948 deaths
German Empire politicians
German people of World War I
Government ministers of Germany
Diplomats from Istanbul
Deutsche Schule Istanbul alumni
Ambassadors of Germany to Turkey
Treaty of Brest-Litovsk negotiators
Witnesses of the Armenian genocide
Expatriates from the German Empire in the Ottoman Empire